Mary Elizabeth Nevill  (born 12 March 1961 in Gawsworth, Cheshire, England) is a British former field hockey player.

Nevill captained the Great Britain squad that won the bronze medal at the 1992 Summer Olympics in Barcelona. She also competed at the 1988 Summer Olympics.

Nevill has played club hockey for Leicester.

After her international career Nevill, as a senior lecturer at the Loughborough University, researched in the area of muscle metabolism during maximum sprint and intermittent exercise with a particular interest in the aetiology of fatigue. She also stayed actively involved in the sport of field hockey, and the former Great Britain women's captain for a while was coach to the England U21 Women's Squad. Besides that, Nevill was director of Institute of Youth Sport.

Nevill is currently Professor and Head of Department of Sport Science in the School of Science and Technology at Nottingham Trent University, Nottingham, England.

Nevill was appointed an Officer of the Order of the British Empire (OBE) in the 2019 New Year Honours for services to Sport and Sports Science.

References

External links
 
 

1961 births
English female field hockey players
English field hockey coaches
Olympic field hockey players of Great Britain
British female field hockey players
Olympic bronze medallists for Great Britain
Field hockey players at the 1988 Summer Olympics
Field hockey players at the 1992 Summer Olympics
Academics of Loughborough University
Living people
Olympic medalists in field hockey
Medalists at the 1992 Summer Olympics
Loughborough Students field hockey players

Officers of the Order of the British Empire